Emilio Badillo Ramírez (born 22 September 1950) is a Mexican politician affiliated with the Institutional Revolutionary Party. As of 2014 he served as Deputy of the LIX Legislature of the Mexican Congress representing Hidalgo.

References

1950 births
Living people
Politicians from Hidalgo (state)
Institutional Revolutionary Party politicians
People from Huejutla de Reyes
21st-century Mexican politicians
Deputies of the LIX Legislature of Mexico
Members of the Chamber of Deputies (Mexico) for Hidalgo (state)